Mirko Esposito (born 8 April 1996) is an Italian professional footballer who plays as a right back.

Club career
He made his Serie A debut for Parma on 24 May 2015 in a game against Verona. Parma went bankrupt at the end of the season and he became a free agent, signing with Crotone.

On 31 January 2019, he signed a 6-month contract with Robur Siena.

On 2 September 2019, he joined Rieti on loan. On 17 September 2020 he moved on new loan to Mantova.

References

External links
 

1996 births
Living people
People from Fidenza
Footballers from Emilia-Romagna
Italian footballers
Association football defenders
Serie A players
Serie C players
Serie D players
Parma Calcio 1913 players
F.C. Crotone players
Paganese Calcio 1926 players
U.S. Catanzaro 1929 players
Catania S.S.D. players
A.S.D. Sicula Leonzio players
A.C.N. Siena 1904 players
U.S. Salernitana 1919 players
F.C. Rieti players
Mantova 1911 players
Sportspeople from the Province of Parma